Gary Davis may refer to:

Gary Davis (American football) (born 1954), American football player
Reverend Gary Davis (1896–1972), American singer
Gary Lee Davis (1944–1997), American convicted murderer
Garry Davis (1921–2013), American peace activist
Garry Davis (boxer) (born 1947), Bahamian boxer
Gary "Litefoot" Davis (born 1969), American businessman and actor
Gary Davis, founder of Davis Motorcar Company
Gary Charles Davis, American actor and stunt performer (Viva Knievel!)

See also
Gary Davies (disambiguation)
Gray Davis (born 1942), former governor of California